The Ground Training Competition, or The Royal Air Squadron Trophy Competition was created in 1998 as a way for CCF (RAF) sections to contest the Royal Air Squadron Trophy.

The regional and national stages
Every CCF(RAF) section that can field a full team is eligible to partake in the Royal Air Squadron Trophy Competition. The TEST (Training, Evaluation & Support Teams) Officers & SNCOs from each area tailor the composition of their regional competition to meet local needs. In general, however, teams of 13 cadets drawn from all age groups compete in a round robin of activities that include: RAF Knowledge (13 Cadets), Drill and Uniform (13 Cadets), Command Task (13 Cadets), Shooting (4 Cadets), Aircraft Recognition (4 Cadets) and First Aid (4 Cadets). The first, second and third placed teams from each of the five regions qualify for the national finals, held at RAF Halton in Spring each year.

Royal Air Squadron Day
The first, second and third place teams are invited to attend the Royal Air Squadron Day which is usually held in June or July each year at the Shuttleworth Collection. During the day cadets may be offered flights in aircraft belonging to the Royal Air Squadron members. The cadets also attend a formal parade, where the Captains of the three teams receive the Geoffrey de Havilland Flying Foundation Medals for CCF Achievement along with the presentation of The Air Squadron Trophy to the first placed team.

Requirements for entry
Each team will comprise one Team Captain (Cadet Corporal or above) and 12 other cadets, who should ideally represent a wide cross-section of age groups within the parent CCF(RAF) Section. The Team Captains role is to manage the team, to give the orders in the Drill competition and, if he or she wishes, to take part in events. A RAFAC officer should accompany the teams.

Results

See also
Combined Cadet Force

References

External links
Air Squadron Official website
Air Cadets  Official website

Youth organisations based in the United Kingdom
Royal Air Force